Gymnopternus is a genus of flies in the family Dolichopodidae. It was formerly placed as a subgenus of Hercostomus, but is now accepted as a separate genus.

Species

References 

Dolichopodidae genera
Dolichopodinae
Taxa named by Hermann Loew